is a Japanese former professional footballer who played as a defender. He played for the Japan national team.

Club career
Nakanishi was born in Suzuka on June 23, 1973. Although he mainly played as a defender, he lso played as a amidfielder and a forward in the mid-1990s. After graduating from high school, he joined JEF United Ichihara in 1992. The club finished in 2nd place at the 1998 J.League Cup and 3rd place in 2001 and 2003 J1 League. He moved to Yokohama F. Marinos in 2004. The club became champions of the 2004 J1 League. He retired at the end of the 2006 season.

International career
In September 1997, Nakanishi was selected to the Japan national team for 1998 World Cup qualification. At this qualification, on September 7, he debuted against Uzbekistan. At the 1998 World Cup, he played in the first two games alongside Masami Ihara and Yutaka Akita. However, he missed the third game. He played 14 matches for Japan until 2002.

Career statistics

Club

International

References

External links

Japan National Football Team Database

1973 births
Living people
Association football people from Mie Prefecture
Japanese footballers
Japan international footballers
J1 League players
JEF United Chiba players
Yokohama F. Marinos players
1998 FIFA World Cup players
Association football defenders